Stoyka Krasteva (born 18 September 1985), née Petrova, is a former Bulgarian boxer who won a gold medal in the women's flyweight division at the 2020 Summer Olympics. She was born in Dobrich, a town in northeastern Bulgaria.

Career
She is the first female boxer who represented Bulgaria in the 2012 Summer Olympics in London in the flyweight division. She lost in the quarterfinals to Great Britain's Nicola Adams 7–16. In end of 2018 Krasteva retired from the sport. Her family, husband and coach to return and in 2020 she returned on the ring. In 2021 Krasteva qualified for the 2020 Summer Olympics in the Women's flyweight category. After 5 consecutive wins she won Bulgaria's first boxing gold medal since 1996, beating top-seeded Buse Naz Çakıroğlu of Turkey 5:0 in the final. In December 2021, Krasteva came second in the Bulgarian Sportsperson of the Year ranking, earning 1241 points.

Achievements

References

Bulgarian women boxers
Olympic boxers of Bulgaria
Boxers at the 2012 Summer Olympics
Boxers at the 2020 Summer Olympics
AIBA Women's World Boxing Championships medalists
Living people
1985 births
People from Dobrich
European Games competitors for Bulgaria
Boxers at the 2015 European Games
Flyweight boxers
Medalists at the 2020 Summer Olympics
Olympic gold medalists for Bulgaria
Olympic medalists in boxing
21st-century Bulgarian women